The discography of Italian singer Annalisa consists of seven studio album and twenty-eight singles as primary artist. She collected seven platinum and eight gold certifications from FIMI.

Studio albums

Singles

As lead artist

As featured artist

Other charted songs

Guest appearances

Music videos

Songwriting credits

References

Discographies of Italian artists